Prema was an Indian actress in Malayalam cinema. She acted mainly in supporting and character roles as a mother, during the 1960s and 1970s and appeared in more than 50 films in her career. She is the mother of actress Shobha.

Personal life
Prema was married to K. P. Menon. National Award-winning actress Shobha was her daughter. She committed suicide, like her daughter, in 1984.

Filmography

 Lahari (1982)
 Thushaaram (1981)
 Viswaroopam (1978)
 Velluvili (1978) as Parvathi
 Padmatheertham (1978) as Madhaviyamma
 Madhuraswapnam (1977)
 Sankhupushpam (1977) as Madhaviyamma 
 Ormakal Marikkumo (1977) as Lakshmi
 Minimol (1977)
 Aaraadhana (1977)
 Priyamvada (1976)
 Paalkkadal (1976)
 Pushpasharam (1976)
 Amba Ambika Ambaalika (1976)
 Ayalkkaari (1976) as Meenakshi 
 Swapnadanam (1976) as Kalyaniyamma
 Kaayamkulam Kochunniyude Makan (1976)
 Naazhikakkallu (1970)
 Chirikkudukka (1976) as Bhargavi
 Thulavarsham (1976) as Maniyan's Mother
 Abhinandanam (1976)
 Chottaanikkara Amma (1976)
 Ammini Ammaavan (1976)
 Criminals (Kayangal) (1975)
 Pravaaham (1975) as Rajamma
 Chief Guest (1975)
 Dharmakshetre Kurukshetre (1975)
 Priyamulla Sophia (1975)
 Priye Ninakkuvendi (1975)
Mattoru Seetha (1975)
 Raagam (1975)
 Sooryavamsam (1975)
 Rahasyaraathri (1974)
 Ayalathe Sundari (1974) as Karthyayani
 College Girl (1974) as Ichaamina
 Sethubandhanam (1974)
 Kaamini (1974)
 Veendum Prabhaatham (1973)
 Panitheeratha Veedu (1973) as Sister
 Manushyaputhran (1973)
Thottavadi (1973) as Pulluvathi
 Kaattuvithachavan (1973)
 Pacha Nottukal (1973) as Lovelamma
 Ajnaathavasam (1973) as Rajamma
 Driksakshi (1973) as Karthyayani
 Padmavyooham (1973) as Rosamma
 Punarjanmam (1972)
 Panimudakku (1972)
 Theertha Yathra (1972)
 Aaradi Manninte Janmi (1972) as Mariakutty
 Nrithasaala (1972) as Gomathi
 Miss Mary (1972) as Saramma
 Taxi Car (1972) as Kamalam
 Naadan Premam (1972)
 Omana (1972) as Leelamma
 Sambhavami Yuge Yuge (1972) as Annamma
 Ananthasayanam (1972)
 Puthrakameshti (1972)
 Pushpaanjali (1972) as Renuka
 Vivaha Sammanam (1971)
 Thettu (1971) as Lissie
 Inquilab Zindabad (1971)
 Sindooracheppu (1971) as Devu
 Makane Ninakku Vendi (1971) as Saramma
 Poompaatta (1971) as Janaki
 Thapaswini (1971)
 Oru Penninte Katha (1971) as Nun
 Aval Alpam Vaikippoyi (1971)
 Vivaaham Swargathil (1970)
 Abhayam (1970)
 Lottery Ticket (1970) as Bharathi
 Aa Chithrashalabham Parannotte (1970)
 Raktha Pushpam (1970)
 Vidyaarthi (1968)
 Shakuntala (1965)
 Nairu Pidicha Pulivalu (1958) as Lalitha
 Rarichan Enna Pauran (1956)
 Avar Unarunnoo (1956)
 Neelakuyil (1954) as Nalini

References

 Prema. Cinidiary.
 Sindooracheppu. The Hindu.

External links

 Prema at MSI

Actresses in Malayalam cinema
Actresses from Chennai
Indian film actresses
1984 deaths
20th-century Indian actresses
Year of birth missing
1984 suicides
Suicides by hanging in India
Artists who committed suicide
Female suicides